Anu Ane Nenu is an Indian Telugu language soap opera premiered on 6 March 2023 airing on GeminiTV and it is available for worldwide streaming on Sun NXT. The show stars Monisha Arshak in titular role and Jai Akash, Chaya Singh in lead roles.

Cast
Monisha Arshak as Anu
Jai Akash as Dr Venkatesh
Chaya Singh as Akshara, Venkatesh's wife
Prasad Babu as Gurumoorthy, Akshara's father
Yamuna Srinidhi as Bhagyalakshmi, Vanitha and Kavitha's mother
Srinivas as Vanitha and Kavitha's father
Sneha Eswar as Akshara's Aunt
Padmini Narasimhan as Parvathamma, Venkatesh's mother
Navyanarayan Gowda as Kavitha
Bhavya poojary as Vanitha
Ankitha Gowda
Draksharamam Saroja as Mahalakshmi, Vanitha's grand mother
Anusha as Neela, Akshara's assistant
Baby Aaradhya as Shruthi, Venkatesh and Akshara's daughter 
Jabardast Sunny as Madhav, Venkatesh's assistant

References

Telugu-language television shows
2023 Indian television series debuts
Gemini TV original programming